Rhinusa is a genus of true weevils in the family of beetles known as Curculionidae. There are at least 20 described species in Rhinusa.

Species
These 23 species belong to the genus Rhinusa:

 Rhinusa acephalus Stephens, 1829 c
 Rhinusa acifer Caldara, 2014 c g
 Rhinusa algiricum Caldara, 2001 c
 Rhinusa antirhini Stephens, 1829 c
 Rhinusa antirrhini Schoenherr, 1825 c g b (toadflax seedhead weevil)
 Rhinusa bipustulata (Rossi, P., 1792) c g
 Rhinusa brevipilis (Desbrochers, 1893) g
 Rhinusa collina Gistel, 1848 c
 Rhinusa comosa Rosenschoeld, 1838 g
 Rhinusa ensifer Caldara, 2014 c g
 Rhinusa exigua Caldara & Korotyaev, 2010 c
 Rhinusa fuentei Pic, 1906 g
 Rhinusa intaminata Stephens, 1829 c
 Rhinusa linariae (Panzer, 1792) c g b (root-gall weevil)
 Rhinusa mauritii Caldara, 2001 c
 Rhinusa neta (Germar, 1821) b
 Rhinusa pelletieri Caldara, 2014 c g
 Rhinusa scrophulariae Caldara in Magnano, Colonneli & Caldara in van Harten (ed.), 2009 c
 Rhinusa smreczynskii (Fremuth, 1972) g
 Rhinusa tetra (Fabricius, 1792) c g b (European curculionid weevil)
 Rhinusa tricolor Stephens, 1829 c
 Rhinusa verbasci Rosenschoeld, 1838 g
 Rhinusa weilli Caldara, 2014 c g

Data sources: i = ITIS, c = Catalogue of Life, g = GBIF, b = Bugguide.net

References

Further reading

External links

 

Curculioninae